Derby North is a constituency  formed of part of the city of Derby, represented in the House of Commons of the UK Parliament since 2019 by Amanda Solloway, a Conservative.

Between 1983 and 2005, the seat was a bellwether; in 2010 and 2017 the seat leaned more to the left than the overall result.

The seat has been relative to others a marginal seat since 2001, as well as a swing seat, as its winner's majority has not exceeded 8.6% of the vote since the 15.9% majority won at that year's general election. The seat has changed hands twice since then.

Boundaries 

1950–1955: The County Borough of Derby wards of Abbey, Babington, Becket, Bridge, Derwent, Friar Gate, King's Mead, and Rowditch.

1955–1974: The County Borough of Derby wards of Abbey, Babington, Becket, Bridge, Derwent, Friar Gate, King's Mead, and Rowditch, and the parish of Chaddesden in the Rural District of Shardlow.

1974–1983: The County Borough of Derby wards of Abbey, Allestree, Breadsall, Chaddesden, Darley, Derwent, Friar Gate, Mickleover, and Spondon.

1983–2010: The City of Derby wards of Abbey, Allestree, Breadsall, Chaddesden, Darley, Derwent, Mackworth, and Spondon.

2010–present: The City of Derby wards of Abbey, Chaddesden, Darley, Derwent, Littleover, Mackworth, and Mickleover.

Many constituency boundaries changed for the 2010 general election; this seat changed quite significantly, by removing three wards (Allestree, Spondon and Oakwood) which at that point were heavily Conservative to the newly created Mid Derbyshire seat. In their place, Littleover and Mickleover wards moved in from Derby South, both of which tended to favour the Liberal Democrats in local elections.

Members of Parliament

Constituency profile
The constituency covers a largely residential area immediately north of Derby city centre, including some of the city's most affluent suburbs, as well as some of its council housing, though much of this is former council housing in private ownership. Unemployment is below the national average. Average incomes are above the national average.

History
A seat contested relatively closely between the two largest parties since 1950, Derby North was held consecutively by the Labour Party's Clifford Wilcock, Niall MacDermot, and Phillip Whitehead. At the 1979 general election, it was covered by the BBC as the bellwether seat as the 41st of 41 seats that the Conservative Party needed to win; that year it stayed under control of Labour, but the Conservatives won the election regardless. Its exit poll was a central point of discussion of the BBC's election night coverage.

The Conservative Greg Knight gained the seat in 1983, and held it until 1997.

Labour's Bob Laxton defeated Knight in 1997 and held the seat until retiring in 2010, when the seat was retained for Labour by Chris Williamson. In 2015, Amanda Solloway, a Conservative; gained the seat with a swing of 0.8%. The 2015 result gave the seat the second-most marginal majority (measured by percentage) of the Conservative Party's 331 seats. Williamson regained the seat in 2017. He was subsequently suspended from the Labour Party, and was blocked in November 2019 from running as a Labour candidate at the following election; he resigned from the party and stated his intention to run as an independent.

Elections

Elections in the 2010s

  

Boundary changes occurred in 2010, so percentage changes are based on notional results

Elections in the 2000s

Elections in the 1990s

Elections in the 1980s

Elections in the 1970s

Elections in the 1960s

Elections in the 1950s

See also 
 List of parliamentary constituencies in Derbyshire

Notes

References

Parliamentary constituencies in Derbyshire
Politics of Derby
Constituencies of the Parliament of the United Kingdom established in 1950